Yengejeh (also Romanized as Yengejh; also known as Yengījeh) is a village in Sarajuy-ye Shomali Rural District, in the Central District of Maragheh County, East Azerbaijan Province, Iran. At the 2006 census, its population was 1,460, in 350 families.

References 

Towns and villages in Maragheh County